Hans Remmer (17 August 1920 – 2 April 1944) was a Luftwaffe ace and recipient of the Knight's Cross of the Iron Cross during World War II. The Knight's Cross of the Iron Cross was awarded to recognise extreme battlefield bravery or successful military leadership. Hans Rammer was killed on 2 April 1944 after he bailed out of his Bf 109, his parachute failed to open and he fell to his death. He was posthumously awarded the Knight's Cross of the Iron Cross on 9 June 1944. During his career he was credited with 27 aerial victories, all against Western forces.

Awards
 Flugzeugführerabzeichen
 Front Flying Clasp of the Luftwaffe
 Ehrenpokal der Luftwaffe
 Iron Cross (1939)
 2nd Class
 1st Class
 German Cross in Gold on 31 August 1943 as Oberleutnant in the I./Jagdgeschwader 27
 Knight's Cross of the Iron Cross on 9 June 1944 as Hauptmann and Staffelkapitän of the 1./Jagdgeschwader 27

References

Citations

Bibliography

External links
TracesOfWar.com
Aces of the Luftwaffe

1920 births
1944 deaths
Military personnel from Freiburg im Breisgau
German World War II flying aces
Recipients of the Gold German Cross
Recipients of the Knight's Cross of the Iron Cross
People from the Republic of Baden
Luftwaffe personnel killed in World War II
Aviators killed by being shot down
Deaths from falls